Waytiri (Aymara, possibly composed of wayta flower, -iri a suffix, Hispanicized spelling Huaitire, Huaytire) is a mountain in the Andes of southern Peru, about  high. It is situated in the Moquegua Region, Mariscal Nieto Province, Carumas District, and in the Tacna Region, Candarave Province, Candarave District. Waytiri lies northeast of the mountain Warintapani.

Waytiri (Huaitire) is also the name of a river near the mountain. Along the village of Waytiri (Huaitire, Huaytiri) it flows to Such'i Lake (Waytiri Lake) in the south.

See also 
 Churi Laq'a
 Ch'alluma

References

Mountains of Peru
Mountains of Moquegua Region
Mountains of Tacna Region